La MICA Biological Station was a biological field station near Parque Nacional General de División Omar Torrijos Herrera in El Copé, Coclé Province, Republic of Panama.  La MICA was established in 2007 by Julie M. Ray, a Ph.D. student from Old Dominion University studying Panamanian snakes.

References

External links 
 "La MICA website", history, future plans, updates on project progress, and species lists.

Nature conservation in Panama
Research institutes in Panama
Biological stations